The 11th Annual Australian Recording Industry Association Music Awards (generally known as the ARIA Music Awards) were held on 22 September 1997 at the Capitol Theatre in Sydney. The event was hosted by Australian actor–comedian Paul McDermott, with presenters Elle McFeast, Kylie Minogue, Ben Folds, Colin Buchanan, the Presidents of the United States of America and others. Savage Garden dominated this year, receiving a record ten awards including Album of the Year for Savage Garden, Single of the Year for "Truly Madly Deeply", Best Group and seven other trophies.

In addition to the annually presented awards, a Special Achievement Award was given to Charles Fisher and an Outstanding Achievement Award was received by Peter André. The ARIA Hall of Fame inducted: the Bee Gees, Graeme Bell and Paul Kelly.

Ceremony details

The event included musical performances by Ben Folds Five, the Presidents of the United States of America and Kylie Minogue. John Farnham teamed up with crooner quartet Human Nature to debut the performance of their single, "Every Time You Cry", which later became a number-three ARIA Singles Chart hit. Crowded House, who won Highest Selling Album for their greatest hits compilation, Recurring Dream, reunited the year after breaking up. They commemorated Paul Kelly's induction into the ARIA Hall of Fame by performing his song "Leaps and Bounds".

Various international and Australian entertainers presented awards to the winners including Australian Elle McFeast (who was nominated for Best Comedy Release), Ben Folds, Kylie Minogue and Chris Ballew, Dave Dederer and Jason Finn of the Presidents of the United States of America. Four Artisan Awards were presented prior to the telecast.

Presenters and performers 

The ARIA Awards ceremony was hosted by Australian comedian and TV presenter Paul McDermott. Presenters and performers were:

Multiple winners and nominees

Savage Garden – 10 awards from 13 nominations
Charles Fisher – 3 awards from 3 nominations
Paul Kelly – 2 awards from 5 nominations (including Hall of Fame)
The Superjesus – 2 awards from 2 nominations
Spiderbait – 1 award from 7 nominations
Silverchair – 1 award from 6 nominations
Crowded House – 1 award from 3 nominations
Powderfinger – 7 nominations

Awards
Nominees and winners with results indicated on the right.

Achievement awards

Outstanding Achievement Award
Peter Andre

Special Achievement Award
Charles Fisher

Hall of Fame Inductees
The ARIA Hall of Fame inductees were:
The Bee Gees
Graeme Bell 
Paul Kelly

For Kelly's induction, Crowded House had reformed to provide a cover version of his "Leaps and Bounds". In 2019 Double J's Dan Condon described this as one of the "7 great performances from the history of the ARIA Awards."

See also
Music of Australia

References

External links
ARIA Awards official website
List of 1997 winners

1997 music awards
1997 in Australian music
ARIA Music Awards